Isohumulones are chemical compounds that contribute to the bitter taste of beer and are in the class of compounds known as iso-alpha acids. They are found in hops.

Beer 
The bitterness of beer is measured according to the International Bitterness Units scale, with one IBU corresponding to one part-per-million of isohumulone.  When beer is exposed to light, these compounds can decompose in a reaction catalyzed by riboflavin to generate free-radical species by the homolytic cleavage of the exocyclic carbon-carbon bond. The cleaved acyl side-chain radical then decomposes further, expelling carbon monoxide and generating 1,1-dimethylallyl radical. This radical can finally react with sulfur-containing amino acids, such as cysteine, to create 3-methylbut-2-ene-1-thiol, a thiol which causes beer to develop a "skunky" flavor.

Formation 
Isohumulones are generated by the isomerization of humulone.

See also
Beer chemistry

References 

Bitter compounds
Cyclopentenes
3-Hydroxypropenals
Humulus